Valery Ivanovich Glivenko (2 January 1897 (Gregorian calendar) / 21 December 1896 (Julian calendar) in Kiev – 15 February 1940 in Moscow) was a Soviet mathematician. He worked in foundations of mathematics, real analysis, probability theory, and mathematical statistics.  He taught at Moscow Industrial Pedagogical Institute until his death at age 43. Most of Glivenko's work was published in French.

See also
Glivenko's double-negation translation
Glivenko's theorem (probability theory)
Glivenko–Cantelli theorem
Glivenko–Stone theorem

Notes

Works

External links
 
 Photograph

Mathematical logicians
1896 births
1940 deaths
Soviet logicians
Soviet mathematicians
Ukrainian mathematicians
20th-century Russian mathematicians
Probability theorists
Mathematical analysts
Moscow State University alumni
Mathematical statisticians